Al-Butayha was a Palestinian Arab village in the Safad Subdistrict. It was depopulated during the 1947–1948 Civil War in Mandatory Palestine on May 4, 1948, by the Palmach's First Battalion during Operation Matateh. It was located 13 km southeast of Safad, quarter of a mile east of the Jordan River, a little northeast of the northern tip of the Sea of Galilee. Many of the inhabitants were forced into Syria.

History
Al-Butayha was located close the Syrian border. The name means "marshland" in Arabic, in reference to the vast stretch of land in the area. In 1459 the village was visited by the Arab geographer al-Qalqashandi.

British Mandate era
It was classified as a hamlet by the Palestine Index Gazetteer. 

In the   1944/45 statistics  the village was counted with Arab al-Shamalina, and together they  had 650 Muslim inhabitants, with a land  area of 16,690 dunums, with 3,842 dunums allocated to cereal farming,  238 dunums under irrigation or used for orchards,  while 12,610 dunams were classified as non-cultivable  land.

1948, and aftermath

On May 4, 1948, the village was attacked by Haganahs  during Operation Matateh ('Operation Broom'),  part of Operation Yiftach. Their orders were to "destroy any points of assembly for invading forces from the east”.

The Palmach's first  Battalion, in addition to units from the   Alexandroni Brigade and local Haganah troops,  started with firing mortar rounds against the villages, then proceeded to burn down them down. A report stated they "blew up most of the houses and burned the tents of Kedar", between  Tabgha and Buheita. Some 15 Arabs were killed, and the rest fled to Syria.

Today
The village was razed in 1948. Some of the cultivated trees such as olives and palms still grow among the ruined houses. Today the village lands are occupied by the settlement of Almagor, which was established in 1961. A popular picnicking spot, Park ha-Yarden ("Jordan River Park"), is 200 metres south of the site.

References

Bibliography

External links
Welcome To al-Butayha
al-Butayha, Zochrot
Butayha, Villages of Palestine
Survey of Western Palestine, Map 6:   IAA, Wikimedia commons

Arab villages depopulated during the 1948 Arab–Israeli War
District of Safad
Sea of Galilee